Edward Thurston Towle (January 1, 1905 – October 19, 1960) was an American football player.

Towle was born in Pawtucket, Rhode Island, in 1905 and attended the Moses Brown School in Providence. He then attended Brown University. He played for the 1926 Brown Bears football team that compiled a 9–0–1 and became known as the "Iron Men" due to playing without substitution in key games. Towle played all but two minutes against Yale, Dartmouth, and Harvard.

He was hired as Brown's ends coach in the fall of 1928. He continued in that post at least through the 1935 season.

He also played one game in the National Football League with the Boston Bulldogs during the 1929 season. 

Towle was later inducted into the Brown Athletics Hall of Fame. 

Towle died in 1960 at age 46.

References

1905 births
1960 deaths
American football ends
Boston Bulldogs (NFL) players
Brown Bears football players
Sportspeople from Pawtucket, Rhode Island
Players of American football from Rhode Island